In 2008, the Saturn Awards introduced a new category, Best International Series, recognizing non-American television productions. Due to an error, the original press release announcing the winners of the 34th Saturn Awards, issued on June 24 2008, omitted the category. However, a corrected press release and website update were issued on June 26, 2008.

The category was discontinued starting with the 35th Saturn Awards nominations for 2008, which were announced on March 16, 2009.

References

N.B. Year column refers to year of eligibility, the actual ceremonies are held the following year to those stated.

Best International Series